Islandeady GAA (Gaelige: CLG Oileán Éadaigh) is a Gaelic football club located in Islandeady, County Mayo. The club was founded in 1904 and currently competes in the Mayo Junior Football Championship. The club won their most recent Junior championship in 2011 and were promoted to Intermediate level. The club were relegated to Junior level in 2020.

Former Taoiseach Enda Kenny played for the club.

Honours
 West Mayo Junior & County Title: 1974, 1985
 Mayo Intermediate Football Championship: 1975
 Mayo Junior Football Championship: 1959, 1974, 1988, 1990, 2011, 2022

References

External links
Islandeady GAA Club Website

Gaelic football clubs in County Mayo